Rajasthan is one of the most popular tourist destinations in India, for both domestic and international tourists.
Rajasthan attracts tourists for its historical forts, palaces, art and culture with its slogan "Padharo Mhare Desh". Jaipur, also known as Pink City, is a very popular tourist destination, being the capital of Rajasthan and a part of the Golden Triangle. The Walled City of Jaipur is a UNESCO World Heritage Site and is only the second Indian city to be recognized, after Ahmedabad.

The palaces of Jaipur, lakes of Udaipur, and desert forts of Jodhpur, Bikaner, and Jaisalmer are among the most preferred destinations of many tourists, Indian and foreign. Tourism accounts for almost 15% of the state's domestic product. In 2019, 52 million domestic tourists visited Rajasthan.

Palaces

Rajasthan is known for its historical hill forts & palaces, it is claimed as the best place for tourism-related to palaces.

 Umaid Bhawan Palace: It is the largest Royal Palace in Rajasthan. It is also one of the largest private residences in the world.
 Lake Palace: It is now a luxury hotel located in Pichola Lake, Udaipur.
 Hawa Mahal: It is known as "Palace of Wind" or "Palace of Breeze" because there are more than 953 Windows in the Palace.
 Rambagh Palace: Formerly a Royal Palace now converted into a Heritage Hotel.
 Devi Garh Palace: Formerly a palace now converted into a Heritage Hotel, In 2006, The New York Times named it as one if leading luxurious hotel in Indian subcontinent.

Forts 
Rajasthan is known for its forts. Hill Forts of Palaces in Rajasthan are also a part of world heritage.

Hill forts in the World Heritage list 

The six Hill Forts of Rajasthan, spread across Rajasthan state in northern India, clustered together as a designated UNESCO World Heritage Site. The forts are mainly based in the Aravalli Range, and were built and enhanced between the 5th and 18th centuries CE by several Rajput kings of different kingdoms. They comprise:
 Chittor Fort at Chittorgarh
 Kumbhalgarh Fort at Kumbhalgarh
 Ranthambore Fort at Sawai Madhopur
 Gagron Fort at Jhalawar
 Amer Fort at Jaipur
 Jaisalmer Fort at Jaisalmer

Some of these forts have defensive fortification wall up to 20 km long, still surviving urban centers and still in use water harvesting mechanism.

Other forts 

These are some of the prominent forts of rajasthan:
 Mehrangarh Fort
 Nahargarh Fort
 Bhatner fort
 Junagarh Fort
 Lohagarh Fort
 Gagron Fort
 Sirohi Fort
 Bhainsrorgarh Fort
 Taragarh Fort 
 Jalore Fort
 Alwar Fort
 Achalgarh Fort
 Nagaur Fort
 Shergrah Fort

Fairs and Festivals 
Department of Tourism of Rajasthan Government organizes multiple fairs & festivals during the year. These festivals & fairs are great tourist attractions. Fairs organized in Rajasthan include:

 Camel Festival, Bikaner (January)
 Nagaur Fair, Nagaur (Jan-Feb.)
 Kite Festival (held on 14 January of every year)
 Desert Festival, Jaisalmer (Jan-Feb.)
 Baneshwar Fair, Baneshwar (Jan-Feb.)
 Gangaur Festival, Jaipur (March–April)
 Mewar Festival, Udaipur (March–April)
 Elephant Festival, Jaipur (March–April)
 Urs Ajmer Sharif, Ajmer (According to Lunar Calendar)
 Summer Festival, Mt. Abu (June)
 Teej Festival, Jaipur
 Kajli Teej, Bundi (July–August)
 Dussehra Festival, Kota (October)
 Marwar Festival, Jodhpur (October)
 Pushkar Fair, Ajmer (November)

Wildlife Sanctuaries and National Parks 

Rajasthan has many wildlife and bird sanctuaries. Prominent among them are Keoladeo Ghana Bird Sanctuary, Ranthambore National Park, Mukundara Hills National Park, Sariska Tiger Reserve and Desert National Park.

Religious Sites 

Rajasthan has many famous temples from medieval times. Some prominent temples include Ghushmeshwar Temple, Eklingji Temple, Shrinathji Temple, Trinetra Ganesh Temple, Ranthambore, Mehandipur Balaji, Govind Dev Ji, Salasar Balaji, Ranakpur Jain temple, Osian temple, Brahma Temple, Pushkar and Dilwara Temples. Along with temples, there are a few important Sufi shrine too, most famous among them is Dargah (Tomb) of Khwaja Moinuddin Chishti.

Popular tourist attractions 
Ajmer - Popular for Ajmer Sharif Dargah and Soniji Ki Nasiyan Jain Temple.
Barmer - Barmer and surrounding areas offer a perfect picture of typical Rajasthani villages.
Bhilwara - Popular for its textile industry. Hamirgarh Eco-park and Harni Mahadev temple are important tourist destinations.
Bikaner - Famous for its havelis, palaces and the Karni Mata Temple in Deshnoke.
Chittorgarh - Popular for its monument and fort.
Bundi - Popular for its forts, palaces and stepwell reservoirs known as baoris.
Dausa - It is popular for Chand Baori and Mehandipur Balaji Temple.
Jaipur - Known as pink city of India and the capital of Rajasthan.
Jaisalmer - Famous for its golden fortress, havelis and some of the oldest Jain temples and libraries.
Jhalawar district - Caves like Binnayaga Buddhist Caves, Hathiagor Buddhist Caves, Kolvi Caves are popular medieval architecture of India.
Jodhpur - Famous for architecture, blue homes giving the name "Blue City" and Mehrangarh fort.
Kota - Known for its gardens, palaces, and Chambal river safari.
Mount Abu - A hill station with 11th century Dilwara Jain Temples. The highest peak in the Aravalli Range of Rajasthan, Guru Shikhar is just 15 km from the main town.mount abu is also good attraction for adventure lover . There is many kind of adventure activities like trekking, caving,Rock climbing , Rappelling etc
Nathdwara - This town near Udaipur hosts the temple of Shrinathji.
Neemrana - home to the Neemrana Fort.
Pushkar - It has the first and one of the very few Brahma temples in the world, and also his wife Savitri Devi's temple, built on a hilltop. The pushkar lake is considered sacred for Hindus.
Ranakpur - Large Jain Temple complex with near 1444 pillars and exquisite marble carvings.
Ranthambore - Situated near Sawai Madhopur. This town has historic Ranthambore Fort and one of the largest national park of India (Ranthambore National Park).
Sariska Tiger Reserve - Situated in the Alwar district.
Shekhawati - Located are small towns such as Mandawa and Ramgarh with frescoed havelis between 100 years to 300 years old, and Vedic period Dhosi Hill.
Udaipur - Known as the "Venice of India".

Outline of tourism in India 

 List of World Heritage Sites in India
 List of national parks of India
 List of lakes of India
 List of waterfalls in India
 List of State Protected Monuments in India
 List of beaches in India
 Incredible India
 List of Geographical Indications in India
 Medical tourism in India
 List of botanical gardens in India
 List of hill stations in India
 List of gates in India
 List of zoos in India
 List of protected areas of India
 List of aquaria in India
 List of forts in India
 List of forests in India
 Buddhist pilgrimage sites in India
 Hindu pilgrimage sites in India
 List of mosques in India
 List of rock-cut temples in India
 Wildlife sanctuaries of India
 List of rivers of India
 List of mountains in India
 List of ecoregions in India
 Coral reefs in India
 List of stadiums in India
 List of museums in India

See also 

List of attractions in Jaipur
Palace on Wheels
Tourist Attractions in Udaipur

References

External links 

 Rajasthan Tourism, Official website Govt. of Rajasthan
 Heritage Hotels in Rajasthan
 Rajasthan Tourism